Equus sivalensis is an extinct species of large equid native to the northern Indian subcontinent. Remains date from the beginning of the Pleistocene, c. 2.58 million years ago until around 600,000 years ago, during the Middle Pleistocene. It is considered a "stenonine horse". Based on isotopes and teeth morphology, it is thought to have been a grazer. The species Equus namadicus has sometimes been suggested to be a synonym due to their similar teeth morphology.

References

 B.J. MacFadden, Fossil Horses, 1992, 2nd ed. 2003 
 Falconer H. and Cautley, Fauna Antiqua Sivalensis, Being the Fossil Zoology of the Siwalik Highlands in the North of India, 1849, London.

External links
Two PDF-files with information on E. sivalensis: Animal remains (PDF), Fossil equids (PDF)
M. Witzel, 

Pleistocene horses
Equus (genus)
Pleistocene mammals of Asia